The 2022 Kansas City Current season is the team's second season as a professional women's soccer team. The Current plays in the National Women's Soccer League, the top tier of women's soccer in the United States. The team was previously known as Kansas City NWSL.

Background 

After finishing in last place during the 2021 season, Kansas City moved head coach Huw Williams into a front-office role. On January 11, 2022, the team hired former United States women's national team assistant coach and U-23 head coach Matt Potter as the team's new head coach for 2022.

Stadium and facilities 
In September 2021, the team announced that it was moving from its 2021 season venue, Legends Field baseball park, to Children's Mercy Park in Kansas City, Kansas, sharing it with Sporting Kansas City of Major League Soccer. In October 2021, the team also announced plans to build its own 11,500-capacity venue on the Berkley Riverfront of Kansas City, which was expected to open in 2024.

In June 2022, the Current opened its own dedicated practice facility in Riverside, Missouri. It is the first purpose-built facility for an NWSL team.

Team

Technical staff

Squad

Competitions

Challenge Cup

Group stage

Central Division standings

Knockout stage

Regular season

Matches

Regular season standings

Results summary

Results by matchday

Awards

NWSL weekly awards

Player of the Week

Save of the Week

Transactions

2022 NWSL Expansion Draft 

The 2022 NWSL Expansion Draft was an expansion draft held by the NWSL on December 16, 2021, for two expansion teams, Angel City FC and San Diego Wave FC, to select players from existing teams in the league. Kansas City Current were exempt from the draft.

2022 NWSL Draft 

Draft picks are not automatically signed to the team roster. The 2022 NWSL Draft was held on December 18, 2021. The NWSL awarded Kansas City all of the defunct Utah Royals FC team's player rights and draft picks upon its dissolution in 2020.

Transfers in

Transfers out

References 

2022 National Women's Soccer League season
American soccer clubs 2022 season
Kansas City Current
Kansas City Current seasons
2022 in sports in Kansas